Angie is an American sitcom television series that aired on ABC from February 8, 1979, to September 4, 1980. The series was created by Garry Marshall and Dale McRaven, and produced by Miller-Milkis Productions (Miller-Milkis-Boyett in Season 2) in association with Paramount Television.

The series stars Donna Pescow in the lead role, Robert Hays as her love interest and eventual husband, Doris Roberts as her mother and Debralee Scott as her sister.

The complete series was released as a Region 1 DVD set on September 1, 2017.

Premise
In Philadelphia, Italian-American coffee-shop waitress Angie Falco starts a romance with customer Bradley Benson, a pediatrician. While she assumes that he is a struggling young doctor, he reveals that he is actually rebelling against his wealthy family.

The other Falco family members are Angie's mother Theresa and her younger sister Marie. Angie and Marie's father had walked out on the family many years earlier, but Theresa continues to set a place for him at the dinner table. Brad's relatives consist of his stuffy father Randall, his overbearing divorced sister Joyce and Joyce's daughter Hillary, with whom Angie forms a close bond.

Frustrated by the arguments between their families over the wedding plans, Angie and Brad elope. Later, Theresa arranges a small Catholic family wedding, merging their two very different families: the blue-blooded, suburban Bensons and the blue-collar, urban Italian-American Falcos. Following the wedding, Brad purchases the coffee shop for Angie.

In the second season, Angie and Theresa open a beauty salon where they must contend with pleasure-seeking hairstylist Gianni. The characters of Hillary Benson and Didi Malloy were not continued after the first season.

The series drew many comparisons to the CBS hit sitcom Rhoda. The character of Angie Falco was seen as an Italian Catholic version of the Jewish character Rhoda Morgenstern (Valerie Harper); both characters come from close-knit ethnic families and have sisters as best friends, overbearing mothers and absent fathers.

Characters

Angelina "Angie" Falco, later Angie Benson (Donna Pescow), is the title character. At first a waitress at the Liberty Coffee Shop in Philadelphia, she meets Dr. Brad Benson, who works at the medical center across the street. Angie is initially unsure about dating him after because of their economic differences, but he convinces her that he loves her. Angie then elopes with him because the families continuously argue about the wedding details. She later accedes to her mother's wishes and has a small Catholic wedding ceremony. Brad buys the coffee shop for Angie to keep her busy, but she later sells it to buy a beauty salon where she employs her mother and sister.

Bradley Benson, M.D. (Robert Hays) is Angie's wealthy pediatrician boyfriend and then husband. Following his wedding to Angie, the couple first live in the large home that he inherited from his parents, but it intimidates her, so they move to a smaller duplex home where Brad practices medicine next door.

Theresa Falco (Doris Roberts) is Angie's and Marie's mother. Her husband deserted the family 19 years earlier, but she remains in denial, still setting a place at the dinner table for him. She loves Brad and wants to make sure that he loves Angie. She is horrified when Angie elopes with Brad but convinces Angie to have a small Catholic family wedding. She owns a newsstand, which she sells in the second season. She is then hired by Angie to work at the beauty salon.

Marie Falco (Debralee Scott) is Theresa's younger daughter and Angie's younger sister. She works nights at a daycare center. Marie is well-meaning but clumsy. In the second season, Angie hires her to work at the beauty salon.

Diedre "DiDi" Malloy (Diane Robin) is Angie's loudmouthed best friend and coworker at the Liberty Coffee Shop (the character only appears twice in the second season).

Joyce Benson (Sharon Spelman) is Brad's snobby three-times-married older sister. She dislikes Angie because she feels that Brad could have married someone of his own station. However, she does try to get along with Angie.

Hillary Benson (Tammy Lauren) is Joyce's daughter (not seen in the second season, as the character was dropped without explanation). She is happy about her uncle's marriage and instantly bonds with her new aunt.

Randall Benson (John Randolph) is Brad's and Joyce's father and Hillary's grandfather. At first, he is stunned by Angie and her family, but as he realizes that she and Brad love each other, he begins to like her and her family.

Phipps (Emory Bass) is the Benson family butler. He likes Angie.

Gianni (Tim Thomerson) is the hairstylist at Rose's House of Beauty, the beauty salon that Angie and Theresa bought after they sold the newsstand and coffee shop. He chases after his female clients to the annoyance of Angie and Theresa.

Mary Mary (Valri Bromfield), Mary Grace (Susan Duvall) and Mary Katherine (Nancy Lane) are three close friends and former schoolmates of Angie's.

Production
Although Thomas L. Miller, Robert L. Boyett and Edward K. Milkis were the show's supervising producers for the second season, the show was produced by Miller-Milkis Productions at Paramount Television. Angie was also one of the few Miller-Milkis productions that did not take place in Miller's hometown of Milwaukee, Wisconsin.

Theme song
The show's theme song, "Different Worlds," was written by Norman Gimbel and Charles Fox and performed by Maureen McGovern. "Different Worlds" peaked at #18 on the Billboard Hot 100 and spent two weeks at #1 on the Billboard adult contemporary chart, McGovern's only #1 on that chart.

Cancellation
The show was a ratings hit during its first half-season on air. It ranked fifth for the 1978–79 season with a 26.7 average household share, thanks in big part to Thursday night lead-in Mork & Mindy, which ranked No. 3. All of the top five shows in 1978–79 were ABC comedies; the others were Laverne & Shirley (No. 1), Three's Company (No. 2) and Happy Days (tying Mork & Mindy at No. 3).

The show was placed in a strong timeslot for 1979-80 fall season, airing between Happy Days and Three's Company on Tuesday nights. However, its Nielsen rating dipped to 19.3, though Laverne & Shirley, which the network renewed, earned an identical rating. The show was moved to Monday nights following the NFL season (when ABC's Monday Night Football slot was vacated). In February 1980, ABC placed the show on indefinite hiatus. It returned in April on Saturday nights, but the series was officially canceled in May. Upon its cancellation, Donna Pescow, who had previously thought that the series had a 50-50 chance of renewal, said: "I don't try to understand it anymore. You have to take it as a big chess game and the only person who sees the total logic is the person making the moves."

The four remaining Season 2 episodes that had been produced before the cancellation were aired later in the year, with the final episode airing on September 4, 1980.

A total of 36 episodes were produced.

Episodes

Season 1 (1979)

Season 2 (1979–80)

Home media
Visual Entertainment released the complete series on DVD in Region 1 on September 1, 2017.

Syndication
Reruns aired on ABC Daytime from June 17 to September 20, 1985.

References

External links

Angie at Retro Junk
Angie at Sitcoms Online

1979 American television series debuts
1980 American television series endings
1970s American sitcoms
1980s American sitcoms
American Broadcasting Company original programming
English-language television shows
Television series by CBS Studios
Television shows set in Philadelphia